The Danville Wings were a Tier I ice hockey team that played the North American Hockey League from 1994 until 2003 when they moved to the United States Hockey League for the 2003–04 season. After that season, the team was relocated to Indianapolis, Indiana and renamed the Indiana Ice. The Wings played their home games at the David S. Palmer Arena in Danville, Illinois.

History
The Western Michigan Wolves first started play in Kalamazoo in the 1988–89 NAHL season. The team rebranded themselves as the Kalamazoo Jr. Wings that next season. The Jr. Wings won the Robertson Cup in the 1990–91 and 1992–93 seasons. The franchise was purchased by rock promoter Jay Goldberg and then relocated to Danville, Illinois after the 1993–94 season.

The Danville Wings would play in the NAHL for nine seasons, winning the Robertson Cup in 2000. After the 2002–03 season, the Wings would move to the United States Hockey League. They only played for one season there before the team was bought as a replacement for the Indianapolis Ice of the pro Central Hockey League, who were moved to Topeka, Kansas after the 2003–04 season.

Season records

References

External links
 North American Hockey League, HockeyDB.com
 United States Hockey League, HockeyDB.com

Defunct North American Hockey League teams
United States Hockey League teams
Wings
1994 establishments in Illinois
2004 disestablishments in Illinois
Ice hockey clubs established in 1994
Ice hockey clubs disestablished in 2004